The Republic of the Congo national under-16 basketball team is a national basketball team of the Republic of the Congo, administered by the Fédération Congolaise de Basketball.
It represents the country in international under-16 (under age 16) basketball competitions.

See also
Republic of the Congo men's national basketball team
Republic of the Congo men's national under-18 basketball team

References

External links
Archived records of Republic of the Congo team participations

Basketball teams in the Republic of the Congo
Men's national under-16 basketball teams
Basketball